A by-election was held for the New South Wales Legislative Assembly electorate of Annandale on 24 June 1933 following the death of sitting member, Robert Stuart-Robertson.

Candidates
 Harry Cotter standing as a Labor Party Unificationist was a first time candidate who never stood again.
Bob Gorman was a first time state Labor candidate.
 Percival McDonald was standing in his second and final election.
 Thomas Wright who stood previously stood as a Communist in the 1930 election in the seat of Kogarah.

Results

The by-election was caused by the death of Robert Stuart-Robertson on 2 June 1933.

See also
Electoral results for the district of Annandale
List of New South Wales state by-elections

References

1933 elections in Australia
New South Wales state by-elections
1930s in New South Wales